Pomatodelphis is an extinct genus of river dolphin from Middle Miocene marine deposits in Alabama, Florida, Brazil, Germany and France.

Classification 
Pomatodelphis belongs to the platanistid subfamily Pomatodelphininae, which is distinguished from the South Asian river dolphin in having a flattened rostrum, a transversely expanded posterior end of the premaxilla, an eye and bony orbit of normal size (not atrophied), and nasal bones not reduced in size but wide transversely. A close relative of Pomatodelphis is Prepomatodelphis from marine deposits in Austria. Three species are known, P. inaequalis, P. bobengi, and P. stenorhynchus.

Fossil distribution 
Fossils of Pomatodelphis have been found in:
 Citronelle Formation (Hemphillian), Alabama
 Solimões Formation (Huayquerian), Brazil
 Marks Head, Peace River and Statenhead Formations, Florida
 France
 Germany

References 

River dolphins
Miocene cetaceans
Miocene mammals of Europe
Neogene France
Fossils of France
Neogene Germany
Fossils of Germany
Miocene mammals of North America
Neogene United States
Hemphillian
Fossils of the United States
Miocene mammals of South America
Neogene Brazil
Huayquerian
Fossils of Brazil
Fossil taxa described in 1921